The Territory of Nebraska was an organized incorporated territory of the United States that existed from May 30, 1854, until March 1, 1867, when the final extent of the territory was admitted to the Union as the state of Nebraska.  The Nebraska Territory was created by the Kansas–Nebraska Act of 1854. The territorial capital was Omaha. The territory encompassed areas of what is today Nebraska, Wyoming, South Dakota, North Dakota, Colorado, and Montana.

History

An enabling act was passed by Congress in 1864. Delegates for a constitutional convention were elected; this convention did not produce a constitution. Two years later, in 1866, a constitution was drafted and voted upon. It was approved by 100 votes. However, a clause in this constitution that limited suffrage to "free white males" delayed Nebraska's entry into the Union for almost a year. The 1866 enabling act for the state was subject to a pocket veto by President Andrew Johnson. When Congress reconvened in 1867, it passed another bill to create the state of Nebraska, on the condition that Nebraska's constitution be amended to remove the suffrage clause. This bill was also vetoed by President Johnson. Congress then overrode his veto.

Early settlement

Several trading posts, forts and towns were established in the Nebraska Territory from the early 19th century through 1867, including Fontenelle's Post founded in the present-day site of Bellevue in 1806. It was first mentioned in fur trading records in 1823. Fort Lisa, founded by Manuel Lisa near present-day Dodge Park in North Omaha was founded in 1812, although Lisa had earlier founded posts further up the Missouri River in Montana and North Dakota.
Fort Atkinson, was founded on the Council Bluff in 1819; in 1822 Cabanne's Trading Post was founded nearby on the Missouri River. Mormon settlers founded Cutler's Park in 1846, and the town of Bellevue was incorporated in 1853.  Nearby Omaha City was founded in 1854, with Nebraska City and Kearney incorporated in 1855. The influential towns of Brownville and Fontanelle were founded that year as well. The early village of Lancaster, later called Lincoln, was founded in 1856, along with the towns of Saratoga, South Nebraska City and Florence.

Early press
The first newspaper published in the terrain that would become Nebraska was a weekly military journal stationed at Ft. Atkinson that was published for five years, from 1822 – 1827 before the fort was closed. Thirty years later the Nebraska territory was settled and print media served the dual purposes of sharing the news and promoting the area for settlement. In 1854 the Nebraska Palladium was the first paper to be published in the territory however it would last less than a year. These territorial newspapers were efficient but rough and many of the papers folded under quickly changed owners, or consolidated with other publications. By 1860 the Nebraska territory had twelve weekly publications, one biweekly and one monthly, with a combined circulation of 9,750. After statehood in 1867 the newspaper industry expanded greatly.

Early military posts
With a variety of early fur trading posts, Fort Atkinson, founded in 1819, was the location of the first military post in what became the Nebraska Territory, as well as its first school. Other posts in the Nebraska Territory included Fort Kearny near present-day Kearney; Fort McPherson near present-day Maxwell; Fort Mitchell near present-day Scottsbluff; Fort Randall, in what is now South Dakota; and Fort Caspar, Fort Halleck, Fort Laramie, and Fort Sanders, in what is now Wyoming.

Boundaries

The Nebraska Territory's original boundaries (as specified by its Organic Act) included much of the original Louisiana Purchase; the territory's boundaries were:
 Southern: 40° N (the current Kansas–Nebraska border);
 Western: the Continental Divide between the Pacific and the Atlantic/Arctic Oceans;
 Northern: 49° N (the U.S.–British North America border);
 Eastern: the White Earth and Missouri rivers.

Subsequent territory creation
Upon creation, the territory encompassed most of the northern Great Plains, much of the upper Missouri River basin and the eastern portions of the northern Rocky Mountains.  The Nebraska Territory gradually reduced in size as new territories were created in the 1860s.

The Colorado Territory was formed February 28, 1861 from portions of the territory south of 41° N and west of 102°03′ W (25° W of Washington, D.C.) (an area that includes present-day Fort Collins, Greeley and the portions of Boulder north of Baseline Road, in addition to portions of Kansas Territory, New Mexico Territory, and Utah Territory).

March 2, 1861, saw the creation of the Dakota Territory. It was made of all of the portions of Nebraska Territory north of 43° N (the present-day Nebraska–South Dakota border), along with the portion of present-day Nebraska between 43° N and the Keya Paha and Niobrara rivers (this land would be returned to Nebraska in 1882).  The act creating the Dakota Territory also included provisions granting Nebraska small portions of Utah Territory and Washington Territory—present-day southwestern Wyoming bounded by 41° N, 110°03′ W (33° W of Washington, D.C.), 43° N, and the Continental Divide. These portions had not been part of the Louisiana Purchase; rather, they had been part of Oregon Country and became part of the United States in 1846.

On March 3, 1863, the Idaho Territory was formed of all the territory west of 104°03′ W (27° W of Washington, D.C.).

See also

 Nebraska in the American Civil War
 California Trail
 First transcontinental railroad
 Historic regions of the United States
 History of Nebraska
 Landmarks of the Nebraska Territory
 Mormon Trail
 Oregon Trail
 Territorial evolution of the United States
 Timeline of Racial Tension in Omaha, Nebraska

References

External links
 "Nebraska as a Territory," History of the State of Nebraska, Chicago: A. T. Andreas, 1882
 History of Nebraska
 History of Nebraska State Government Organization (PDF)

 
Former organized territories of the United States
History of the American West
Pre-statehood history of Nebraska
Pre-statehood history of Colorado
Pre-statehood history of Montana
Pre-statehood history of South Dakota
Pre-statehood history of North Dakota
Pre-statehood history of Utah
Pre-statehood history of Wyoming
1854 establishments in Nebraska Territory
1867 disestablishments in the United States
States and territories established in 1854
States and territories disestablished in 1867